São Thomé Lighthouse is located in Praia do Farol (Lighthouse Beach), in the Brazilian municipality of Campos dos Goytacazes, Rio de Janeiro.

History

The work was designed by the French engineer Gustave Eiffel, who also participated in the construction of the Statue of Liberty (1888), and of the Eiffel Tower (1889). It has  of height and 216 steps.

The monument was built by a French firm in the year 1877. Its inauguration was in 1882, commemorating the birthday of Princess Isabel. It was made of a special corrosion resistant iron, which is why it is still in good condition. The lantern was surrounded by glass pane and fitted with a 3-centimeter-thick glass lens with a 1 kW bulb, and emitted 8 fan-shaped lanes of light reaching 25 miles or so.

At the time of its inauguration, it worked kerosene, but currently it works with commercial electric power, but it has 2 generators and can still run the kerosene as originally, if necessary. It lights up according to sunset time and makes the full turn in 68 seconds. During World War II, this area served to land helicopters for supply when they traveled to the coasts of the region.

See also
List of lighthouses in Brazil

References

External links
 Farol São Tomé. Brazilian Navy

Lighthouses completed in 1882
Lighthouses in Brazil